Pseudoschoenionta is a monotypic beetle genus in the family Cerambycidae erected by Stephan von Breuning in 1954. Its only species, Pseudoschoenionta libellula, was described by Karl Jordan in 1894.

References

Saperdini
Beetles described in 1894
Monotypic beetle genera